Light's Fort was built in 1742 by Johannes Peter Leicht  [John Light] (1682-1758). Light's Fort is the oldest standing building of any kind in the county and city of Lebanon, Pennsylvania.  John Light, an immigrant, purchased the land on December 29, 1738, from Caspar Wistar, and wife, Katherine, of the City of Philadelphia, Brass Button Maker, for 82 pounds and 4 shillings. Light's Fort was built in 1742 on a tract of land, which was situated on a branch of the Quittapahilla Creek in Lancaster County (now Lebanon County) at North 11th and Maple Streets. It contained 274 acres including an allowance of 6% for roads together with woods, water courses, etc.

Usages

The historic uses of Light's Fort were a frontier homestead, a community meeting hall, a Mennonite Religious meeting facility, a storage warehouse when the Union Canal (Pennsylvania) was operating and a private fortress during the French and Indian War that could shelter up to two hundred settlers during Native Indian uprisings. In modern times, it has been used as a grain storage facility, a distillery, a beverage distributorship, apartment building and museum.

Building Description

The dimensions of Light's Fort are 30 feet (9.2m) by 40 feet (12.3m).  It is built of local limestone and timbers. Its architectural style is Colonial: Pennsylvania German Traditional, which was used by early German speaking settlers in the southeastern and central Pennsylvania area in the 1700s.  When it was built, it had two and a half stories, but due to strong storms and renovations part of the second story and most of the attic have been removed. It also has a large arched basement that is accessed by a set of limestone stairs. The cellar was built over a constant running fresh water spring and was used for cold storage. The fresh water spring survives today. A bronze plaque is attached above the west side entrance door that reads: “Home and Refuge of Johannes Leicht – (John Light) D. 1759, LIGHT’S FORT, Built 1742, Placed by the Tulpehocken Chapter of the Daughters of the American Colonists, 1974”.

Light's Fort During the French and Indian War

Since the Lebanon area was a crossroads in the expanding North American frontier skirmishes with Native Indians did occur. As a precaution, many fortifications, forts and blockhouses were constructed in this area during the French and Indian War. These strongholds included seven private fortresses: Bethel Moravian Church Fort (Fredericksburg), Benjamin Spycker's Stockade (Jackson Township), George Gloninger's Fort (Pleasant Hill), Isaac Meier Homestead (Myerstown), Light's Fort (Lebanon), Ulrich's Fort (Annville) and Zeller's Fort - Heinrich Zeller House (Newmanstown); one fort built by the Pennsylvania Colonial Militia: Fort Swatara (Inwood); and four blockhouses: Adam Harper's (Harper Tavern), Joseph Gibber's (Fredericksburg), Martin Hess’ (Union Township) and Philip Breitenbach's (Myerstown). The Pennsylvania colonial militia used Light's Fort and other strongholds when troops were scouting or deployed in the area.

Light's Fort was a private fort (it was not built or funded by the British government or the Pennsylvania colonial militia). The structure was funded and built by John Light (a private citizen and frontier settler). With its fourteen-inch thick exterior walls made of limestone and its roof covered with clay tiles to prevent fires from flaming arrows it stood as a formidable force against Native Indian attacks. Most other buildings in the area during the French and Indian War were made from logs and were susceptible to raids and fire. Local settlers and townspeople found shelter in Light's Fort during raids and attacks. The sturdy Light's Fort served as a deterrent against major Native Indian aggression during the French and Indian War and assisted the British in their defeat of the French and their allies.

Tunnels

The large arched cellar in Light's Fort was used as refuge for townspeople from marauding Native Indians during the French and Indian War. There were tunnels that ran from the Light's Fort cellar for almost a mile. These tunnels were used by nearby townspeople when they had to travel to the safety of Light's Fort during Native Indian uprisings. The tunnels had two entrance/exit points: one was hidden in a wooded area (near present-day North 10th Street and Willow Street, Lebanon, PA), and it connected to another tunnel in a residential area (near present-day North 8th Street and Cumberland Street, Lebanon, PA). The tunnel network became obsolete after the French and Indian War. In 1818, the original Lebanon County Courthouse was built over one of its entrance/exit points at North 8th Street and Cumberland Street. In 1825, the section leading into the cellar would have been blocked off by construction of the Union Canal towpath canal that ran and operated just south of Light's Fort near present-day Guilford Street in Lebanon, PA. As late as the 1890s, portions of this tunnel network were still accessible through the basement at Stevens School (present-day Stevens Towers at North 10th Street and Willow Street). Because these tunnels were abandoned the openings in the Light's Fort cellar walls were closed with limestone building stones and plastered with concrete sometime during the mid to late-1800s. These tunnels have been part of local folklore for many years and mysterious stories about them survive and prosper.

Ghosts of Light's Fort

Over the decades many ghost sightings have occurred at Light's Fort. Most notably, is the sighting of a Native Indian girl that was reported by apartment tenants during the 1960s. Historically, there was a foiled Indian attack at Light's Fort in 1757. Marcella Light (daughter of John Light) thought she was doing a good deed on a bitterly cold November night in 1757, as she discovered a crying Native Indian girl outside of Light's Fort that claimed she was lost from her tribe, cold and hungry. Marcella brought the Native Indian girl inside to the kitchen and feed her a hot pork dinner and then took her upstairs to sleep. As the Native Indian girl laid down on a bed a tinderbox fell from her clothes. Marcella thought this was odd because she had the ability to light a fire to keep warm, but failed to do so. Now suspicious, Marcella pretended to fall asleep and she soon saw the girl sneaking downstairs so she quietly followed her. The Native Indian girl went out to the barn and was attempting to set it aflame. Marcella proceeded to knock her unconscious and then called for her father who went out to the barn to investigate the incident. John Light handed Marcella a hunting knife and told her to finish off the Native Indian girl, which she promptly did. A vacated camp near Light's Fort was soon discovered and it was assumed that the Native Indians realized their plot to raid and burn Light's Fort failed so they fled the area. Another apparition reported at Light's Fort was a man dressed in colonial-style clothes that was seen on the second floor. In 2015, a lone workman performing repairs on a warm day reported cold eerie feelings while on a ladder.

Work in Progress Renovations

The Historic Preservation Trust of Lebanon County is conducting work in progress restorations to the interior and exterior of Light's Fort. Exterior renovations will include the reconstruction of the portion of the exterior walls and roof that were removed in the 1900s. Old limestone building stones were donated that are currently in storage and will be used to complete the exterior walls. New wood roof rafters will be installed and the roof will be covered with clay tiles to complete the building to its original external configuration. Interior restorations will include the plastering and painting of all interior walls, covering all floors with wood plank boards, replacing current doors and windows with Colonial style products, building solid wood shutters that hinge and swing from the inside on all windows, installing a public accessible restroom on the first floor and rebuilding the fireplace with its original bricks. The end result envisioned will be to make Light's Fort a living museum of United States colonial history.

References

External links
Friends of Light's Fort
Fort Zeller was built in 1745 by Heinrich Zeller
The house of Benjamin Spycker
Fort Swatara
The Isaac Meier Homestead
Lebanon County Historical Society
Union Canal Tunnel Park in Lebanon, PA
The French and Indian War in Pennsylvania
Pennsylvania in the American Revolution

Buildings and structures completed in 1742
Forts in Pennsylvania
Colonial forts in Pennsylvania
Buildings and structures in Lebanon County, Pennsylvania
1740s in Pennsylvania
1742 establishments in Pennsylvania